Blue Jay is a census-designated place (CDP) in Whitewater Township, Hamilton County, Ohio, United States. The population was 1,427 at the 2020 census.

Geography
An interchange between Interstate 74 and Interstate 275 is south of the center of the CDP. Harrison, Ohio is located just west of Blue Jay.

References

Census-designated places in Hamilton County, Ohio
Census-designated places in Ohio